Martin Glover (born 27 December 1960), better known by his stage name Youth, is a British record producer and musician, best known as a founding member and bassist of the rock band Killing Joke. He is also a member of the Fireman, along with Paul McCartney.

Early career 
Martin Glover was born on 27 December 1960 in Slough, at that point part of  Buckinghamshire, England. He attended Kingham Hill School, an independent private school in Oxfordshire, where he met Alex Paterson, who would become a roadie for Glover's band Killing Joke, and later founder of The Orb. Naming himself "Youth" after the roots reggae chanter Big Youth, in 1977 he joined punk rock band the Rage, who toured with the Adverts. Later he joined "4 Be 2", a band formed by John Lydon's brother Jimmy Lydon, and recorded the "One of the Lads" single with them.

Youth was the bass player in Killing Joke but left the band in 1982 and soon after founded his own commercially orientated dub funk band Brilliant with future member of The KLF, Jimmy Cauty. The act recorded one album with producers Stock Aitken Waterman (SAW) in 1985 before disbanding.

Explaining how SAW's creative process influenced both him and Cauty, Youth said, "We'd be co-writing with them, starting a new song and Pete Waterman would come in with a handful of New York import 12"s with him and he'd go to the record player and say, 'Right, that's the fuckin' bassline!' and then he'd play another record and go, 'That's the beat!'. Then he'd play another record, it's Cyndi Lauper, and he'd go, 'That's the melody!"

"It was that Picasso thing; don't borrow, steal it. I loved that. And that got me and Jimmy thinking, let's go further and sample it, and make the music from other people's records."

Youth also played bass on the Bollock Brothers' discomix 12", "The Slow Removal of Vincent Van Gogh's Left Ear". Jimmy Lydon, brother of John Lydon, was a member of the band.

In 1989, Youth and Alex Paterson started the WAU! Mr. Modo label. Their early releases were industrial techno dubs and heavy sound system dubs from artists such as roots reggae singer Napthali, Manasseh, Bim Sherman and Jah Warrior.

Youth's connections with dub continued in the mid-1990s when he was asked by Adrian Sherwood to remix some of Bim Sherman's tracks for a reworking of the Miracle album. He also recently appeared on a Ted Parsons/NIC dub album, contributing a remix which opens with a sample from Glen Brown's "Version '78", a track originally released on the South East label.

In the early nineties, Youth formed techno and house music duo Blue Pearl together with American singer Durga McBroom. They scored a handful of hit singles including their blue vinyl debut "Naked in the Rain", which reached No. 4 in the UK Singles Chart and was also a No. 5 dance hit in the U.S. in 1990. It was followed by "Little Brother" and "(Can You) Feel the Passion". An album, Naked, was also released.

In 1994, Youth rejoined Killing Joke and their album Pandemonium was released on his Butterfly Recordings label, as was the 1996 follow-up, Democracy.

He is credited with founding the first psychedelic trance record label, Dragonfly Records, as well as the Liquid Sound Design and Kamaflage Records labels. He is well known in the psychedelic trance scene, collaborating with Simon Posford and Saul Davies as Celtic Cross, with Greg Hunter and Simon Posford as Dub Trees, and on the project Zodiac Youth. He has performed both full-on trance as well as chill-out DJ sets at several Return to the Source parties, and released the Ambient Meditations 3 mix album on their label in 2000. His Butterfly Studios were also home of the Return to the Source offices circa 1999–2002.

Later career 

Youth's Butterfly Records label has produced artists such as Take That, Wet Wet Wet, Tom Jones, the Orb, System 7, Maria McKee and Heather Nova. Youth was the co-producer of the Verve's Urban Hymns and Dolores O'Riordan's Are You Listening?. He has also worked, produced and remixed for bands including Kate Bush, Guns N' Roses, Primal Scream, Embrace, Siouxsie and the Banshees, Gaudi, Art of Noise, Crowded House, Zoe, P.M. Dawn, Pop Will Eat Itself, Yazoo, Erasure, U2, Bananarama, INXS, James and Suns of Arqa.

Youth had also made plans to work with Duran Duran in the later stages of their lost album Reportage, before it was shelved later in 2006.

In 2008, Youth produced the Delays album Everything's the Rush, the Futureheads' This Is Not The World and worked on the debut album of American band The Daylights. In 2013, Glover produced the debut album Collective by the DIY indie rock band Echotape, followed by Meteorites by Echo and the Bunnymen and Lion by Peter Murphy. The following year, Glover produced Culture Club's Tribes album.

Youth is a member of the band Transmission, together with Simon Tong of the Verve, Paul Ferguson of Killing Joke and Tim Bran of Dreadzone. He also played guitar on several tracks on the 2007 Client album Heartland.

In mid-2010, he teamed up with Alex Paterson (of the Orb) to compile a retrospective compilation album of tracks from the WAU! Mr Modo label. The album titled Impossible Oddities was released on CD and double vinyl on 25 October 2010 via Year Zero Records.

On 27 October 2012, during the International Festival of Music Producers and Sound Designers SOUNDEDIT, Youth was awarded The Man with the Golden Ear Award.

In 2016, he received the PPL Music Producers Guild Lifetime Achievement award and released the album Create Christ, Sailor Boy with David Tibet as Hypnopazūzu.

In 2017, he teamed up with Gaudi for two collaborative releases as 'YOUTH & GAUDI': the vinyl 10in '2063: A Dub Odyssey' (printed on a limited edition green vinyl) and their debut album 'Astronaut Alchemists', both on Liquid Sound Design.
Subsequently, the duo released the double album 'Astronaut Alchemists – Remixes' featuring Banco de Gaia, The Orb, Kaya Project, Bombay Dub Orchestra, Kuba, Gabriel Le Mar, Pitch Black, BUS/Gus Till, Vlastur, Deep Fried Dub, The Egg, Jef Stott/Aslan Dub, Onium, Living Light, Sadhu Sensi, DM-Theory and Uncle Fester On Acid.

In 2018, he recorded a collaborative album with Nik Turner. Pharaohs from Outer Space was released by Painted Word on 17 August 2018.

In 2019 he teamed up with italian musician Emilio Sorridente and created The Dream Symposium. They recorded the space rock album 'Green Electric Muse' that was produced by Youth and released in 2020 by Youthsounds Records.

In 2021 he received the Grammy Award in the category „Best Reggae Album – 2020" as a producer of Got to Be Tough by Toots and the Maytals.

Production discography 

Taken from Martin Glover's Youth site.

References

Further reading

External links 

 You Say It's Your Birthday: Youth of Killing Joke from VH1
 Official Website
 Martin Glover: Before Killing Joke, Youth tells us about his whole adventure in punk rock

1960 births
Living people
People from Slough
English record producers
English songwriters
Killing Joke members
Brit Award winners
British post-punk musicians
English rock bass guitarists
Ambient musicians
Transmission (band) members
Pigface members
Suns of Arqa members